Where I Find My Heaven is a compilation album by Gigolo Aunts released in the UK, first on Nectar Masters (1997), and then on Fire Records (1998).  The album collects a number of singles and b-sides from 1993 through 1995.  The album includes a cover of "Winsor Dam", a 1991 recording by Big Dipper that did not receive its formal release until the 2008 compilation album Supercluster: The Big Dipper Anthology.

Track listing
UK Version (Nectar Masters) Catalog Number: NTMCD549 (1997)
UK Version (Fire Records) Catalog Number: FIRECD71 (1998)

"Cope" (Brouwer, Gibbs, Hurley, Hurley)  3:50
"Bloom" (Brouwer, Gibbs, Hurley, Hurley)  4:00
"That's O.K." (Brouwer, Gibbs, Hurley, Hurley)  3:59
"Gun" (Brouwer, Gibbs, Hurley, Hurley)  4:40
"Take Me On" (Brouwer, Gibbs, Hurley, Hurley)  2:34
"Walk Among Us" (Brouwer, Gibbs, Hurley, Hurley)  4:21
"Serious Drugs" (Duglas T. Stewart, Norman Blake, Joe McAlinden)  3:57
"Mrs. Washington" (Brouwer, Gibbs, Hurley, Hurley)  4:06
"Ask" (Morrissey/Johnny Marr)  2:24
"Winsor Dam" (Bill Goffrier, Jeff Oliphant, Steve Michener, Gary Waleik)  4:40
"Where I Find My Heaven" (Brouwer, Gibbs, Hurley, Hurley)  3:25
"Ride On Baby Ride On" (Brouwer, Gibbs, Hurley, Hurley)  5:17
"Lemon Peeler" (Brouwer, Gibbs, Hurley, Hurley)  3:28
"Shame" (Brouwer, Gibbs, Hurley, Hurley)  4:03
"Weird Sister" (Brouwer, Gibbs, Hurley, Hurley)  3:52

References

1997 compilation albums
Gigolo Aunts albums